Brodki is a rural locality (a village) in Spasskoye Rural Settlement, Vologodsky District, Vologda Oblast, Russia. The population was 1 as of 2002.

Geography 
Brodki is located 54 km southwest of Vologda (the district's administrative centre) by road. Dovodchikovo is the nearest rural locality.

References 

Rural localities in Vologodsky District